Chaskele is a 2018 Ghanaian movie directed and written by Cornelius Phanthomas also known as Kobi Rana.

Cast
 Fella Makafui 
 Liwin
 Kalsoume Sinare 
 Richmond Xavier Amoako (Lawyer Nti)
 Reverend Bernard Nyarko 
 Ian Wordi

External links
Chaskele

References

Ghanaian drama films
2018 films